C. B. I. Shiva is a 1991 Kannada action drama film directed and written by B. Ramamurthy. The film features an ensemble cast including Tiger Prabhakar, Ramesh Aravind, Sunil, Jaggesh and Shruti along with Madhuri, Sridevi and Avinash in other pivotal roles.

The film featured an original score and soundtrack composed by Upendra Kumar.

Cast 

 Tiger Prabhakar as Shiva
 Ramesh Aravind as Bhaskar
 Sunil as Indudhar
 Jaggesh as Chandru
 Shruthi as Shruthi    
 Tara as Ranjini
 Madhuri as Devi
 Sridevi as Malathi
 Avinash as Bettappa
 Lohithaswa as Chief Minister Sharanappa
 Kunigal Nagabhushan as Doctor

Soundtrack 
The music was composed by Upendra Kumar.

References

External links 

 CBI Shiva Full Length Kannada Movie

1991 films
1990s action drama films
1990s Kannada-language films
Indian action drama films
1991 drama films